Maria Lim Bi Yao (February 4, 1925 – November 2, 2020), known professionally as Maria Tsien (sometimes also credited as Marie Tsien and Maria Tsien McClay) was an American film and television actress in the 1950s and 1960s. She was often cast in productions that were set in Asia, to fill out non-Asian casts.

Filmography

Film

Television

References

External links

Maria Tsien on TV.com
Marie Tsien McClary (sic) on TV.com

American television actresses
American film actresses
20th-century American actresses
Filipino emigrants to the United States
1925 births
2020 deaths
21st-century American women